Entoloma moserianum is a species of fungus in the family Entolomataceae. Found in the Netherlands where it grows on the ground in deciduous forests, it was described as new to science in 1983 by Machiel Noordeloos. The species is classified in Entoloma section Entoloma, and is similar to E. sinuatum. The fruit bodies of E. moserianum are characterized by pale colors, yellow spots on the cap, gills, and stipe, and gill edges that are partially to completely sterile. Its spores measure 9.3–11.5 by 8.1–9.3 μm The specific epithet honors Austrian mycologist Meinhard Michael Moser.

See also
List of Entoloma species

References

External links

Entolomataceae
Fungi of Europe
Fungi described in 1983
Taxa named by Machiel Noordeloos